The McMinnville UFO photographs, also known as the Trent UFO photos, were taken by a farming couple, Paul and Evelyn Trent near McMinnville, Oregon, United States on May 11, 1950. The photos were reprinted in Life magazine and in newspapers across the nation, and are often considered to be among the most famous photographs ever taken of a UFO. UFO skeptics consider these photographs a hoax, although many ufologists continue to argue that the photos actually depict a genuine three dimensional unidentified flying  object in the sky.

Although these images have become known as the "McMinnville UFO Photographs", the Trent farm was actually just outside Sheridan, Oregon, approximately nine miles (15 km) southwest of McMinnville, which was the nearest larger town.

According to astronomer William K. Hartmann's account, on 11 May 1950 at 7:30 p.m., Evelyn Trent was walking back to her farmhouse after feeding her caged rabbits. Before reaching the house, she noticed a slow-moving, metallic disk-shaped object heading in her direction from the northeast. She yelled for her husband, Paul, who was inside the house; he claimed that upon leaving the house, he also saw the object. After watching the object for a short time, he went back inside their home to obtain a camera; he said he managed to take two photos of the object before it sped away to the west. Paul Trent's father also claimed he briefly viewed the object before it flew away.

Hartmann's version of the incident traces back to an interview the Trents gave to Lou Gillette, host of the radio station KMCM (later KLYC), and quoted in The Oregonian newspaper on 10 June 1950. However, the Trents had given a slightly different version of the incident to the local McMinnville newspaper, the Telephone Register, two days earlier on 8 June 1950. In that version, Evelyn Trent stated "We'd been out in the back yard. Both of us saw the object at the same time. The camera! Paul thought it was in the car but I was sure it was in the house. I was right—and the Kodak was loaded with film..."

Initial publicity
The roll of film in the Trent's camera was not entirely used up, so the Trents did not have the film developed immediately. The film was not developed until the remaining frames were used in shooting family photographs for Mother's Day, Sunday, 14 May 1950.

In a 1997 interview, the Trents claimed that they initially thought the object they had photographed was a secret military aircraft, and feared the "photos might bring them trouble." When he mentioned his sighting and photographs to his banker, Frank Wortmann, the banker was intrigued enough to display them from his bank window in McMinnville.

Shortly afterwards Bill Powell, a local newspaper reporter, convinced Mr. Trent to loan him the negatives. Powell examined the negatives and found no evidence that they were tampered with or faked. On June 8, 1950, Powell's story of the incident—accompanied by the two photos—was published as a front-page story in the McMinnville Telephone-Register. The headline read: "At Long Last—Authentic Photographs Of Flying Saucer[?]"

The story and photos were subsequently picked up by the International News Service (INS) and sent to other newspapers around the nation, thus giving them wide publicity. Life magazine published cropped versions of the photos on June 26, 1950, along with a photo of Trent and his camera. The Trents had been promised that the negatives would be returned to them; however, they were not returned—Life magazine told the Trents that it had misplaced the negatives.

Condon Committee investigation
In 1967, the negatives of the Trent photos were found in the files of the United Press International (UPI), the news service which had merged with INS years earlier. The negatives were then loaned to William K. Hartmann, an astronomer who was working as an investigator for the Condon Committee, a government-funded UFO research project based at the University of Colorado Boulder. The Trents were not immediately informed that their "lost" negatives had been found. Hartmann interviewed the Trents and was impressed by their sincerity; the Trents apparently never asked for any money for their photos, nor could he find any evidence that they had sought any notoriety from them.

In Hartmann's analysis, he wrote to the Condon Committee that "This is one of the few UFO reports in which all factors investigated, geometric, psychological, and physical, appear to be consistent with the assertion that an extraordinary flying object, silvery, metallic, disk-shaped, tens of meters in diameter, and evidently artificial, flew within sight of two witnesses."

One reason for this conclusion was due to the photometric analysis of the images. Hartmann noted that the brightness of the underside of the object appeared to be lighter than the underside of the oil tank seen in the images. This could be due to the effects of atmospheric extinction and scattering, the same effects that make distant mountains appear "washed out" and blue. This effect suggested the objects were further from the camera than the tank, not small, local objects."

Hartmann did, however, also point out the possibility that the images were manufactured. He noted that "The object appears beneath a pair of wires, as is seen in Plates 23 and 24. We may question, therefore, whether it could have been a model suspended from one of the wires. This possibility is strengthened by the observation that the object appears beneath roughly the same point in the two photos, in spite of their having been taken from two positions." and concludes "These tests do not rule out the possibility that the object was a small model suspended from the nearby wire by an unresolved thread."

Hartmann also noticed a discrepancy that would later become the main point of objection for later skeptics. He noticed that the overall lighting of the image was consistent with the lighting that would be expected around sunset, but noted that "There could be a possible discrepancy in view of the fact that the UFO, the telephone pole, possibly the garage at the left, and especially the distant house gables (left of the distant barn) are illuminated from the right, or east. The house, in particular, appears to have a shadow under its roof that would suggest a daylit photo, and combined with the eastward incidence, one could argue that the photos were taken on a dull, sunlit day at, say, 10 a.m."

After Hartmann concluded his investigation he returned the negatives to UPI, which then informed the Trents. In 1970, the Trents asked Philip Bladine, the editor of the News-Register (the successor of the Telephone-Register), for the negatives; the Trents noted that they had never been paid for the negatives and thus wanted them back. Bladine asked UPI to return the negatives, which it did. However, for some reason, Bladine did not inform the Trents that the negatives had been returned.

Maccabee analysis
In 1975, the negatives were found in the files of the News-Register by Bruce Maccabee, an optical physicist for the U.S. Navy and a ufologist. After completing his own study of the photos, Maccabee ensured that the original negatives were finally returned to the Trents.

Maccabee analyzed the photos and concluded that the photographs were not hoaxed and showed a "real, physical" object in the sky above the Trent farm. Much of his analysis is based on densitometric measurements, similar to the photometric analysis done by Hartmann. Maccabee argued that the brightness of the object's underside suggested it was at some distance from the camera, not a smaller object close to it.

Maccabee also analyzed the position of various objects in the image as well as an image prepared by Hartmann when he visited the site in June 1967. Based on this, Maccabee argued that the line-of-sight of the two images intersected some distance behind the power lines seen in the photos, providing further evidence, in his opinion, that it was not a small model suspended from the lines. Maccabee stated that his analysis of the object did not find any evidence of a thread or string suspending it from the power lines.

In reply to the skeptical arguments that shadows on objects in the photos proved that they were taken in the morning rather than in the early evening, as the Trents had claimed, Maccabee argued that cloud conditions in the McMinnville area on the evening of the sighting could have caused the shadows on the garage. He also stated, in response to the 2013 IPACO photoanalysis that concluded the photos were a hoax, that "regarding [their] photogrammetric analysis, I showed that the sighting lines did not cross under the wires and they did not refute this...I still stand on my original work."

Suggested hoax explanation

In the 1980s, journalists and noted UFO skeptics Philip J. Klass and Robert Sheaffer, stated their opinions that the photos were faked, and that the entire event was a hoax.

Their primary argument stated that shadows on a garage on the left-hand side of the photos proved that the photos were taken in the morning rather than in the early evening, as the Trents had claimed. Klass and Sheaffer argued that since the Trents had apparently lied about the time of day the photos were taken, their entire story was thus suspect. They also claimed that the Trents had shown an interest in UFOs prior to their alleged sighting.

Additionally, their analysis of the photos suggested that the object photographed was small and likely a model hanging from power lines visible at the top of the photos. They also believed the object may have been the detached side-view mirror of a vehicle. The object has a shape that is somewhat similar to the round mirrors that were used on Ford vehicles produced at the same time the photo was allegedly taken. 

Klass also claimed to have found a number of contradictions in the Trents' story of the sighting, and noted that their version of the incident changed over the years. His conclusion was that the Trents had fabricated the event.

After Sheaffer sent his research and conclusions to William Hartmann, Hartmann withdrew his previous positive assessment of the case which had been forwarded to the Condon Committee.

In April 2013, three researchers with IPACO posted two studies to their Web site titled "Back to McMinnville pictures" and "Evidence of a suspension thread." They argued that the geometry of the photographs is most consistent with a small model with a hollow bottom hanging from a wire suspended from the power lines above, and they stated that they had detected the presence of a thread above the object. Their conclusion was that "the clear result of this study was that the McMinnville UFO was a model hanging from a thread."

Aftermath

The McMinnville UFO photographs remain among the best-publicized in UFO history. Skeptics continue to argue the two photographs are hoaxes and/or fakes. Ufologists continue to insist that the Trent photos are credible evidence that UFOs are a real, physical phenomenon. Over the years, the Trents have consistently been described as honest, simple farm folk who never attempted to profit from their photographs, nor the notoriety they brought them. Evelyn Trent died in 1997 and Paul Trent in 1998; both insisted until the end of their lives that the sighting, and the photos, were genuine. The interest surrounding the Trent UFO photos led to an annual "UFO Festival" being established in McMinnville; it is now the largest such gathering in the Pacific Northwest, and is the second-largest UFO festival in the nation after the one held in Roswell, New Mexico.

References

Bibliography

See also
 Rhodes UFO photographs
 List of reported UFO sightings

External links
 

 A critical analysis of the Trent photos from Robert Sheaffer's website The Debunker's Domain
 Bruce Maccabee's rebuttal to the Klass-Sheaffer explanation
 Discussion of overlooked aspects of the Trent case from "Historical Inquiry" blog
 A ufologist offers a rebuttal of the IPACO skeptical analysis

1950 in Oregon
1950 works
1950 in art
Black-and-white photographs
History of Oregon
McMinnville, Oregon
Photographs of the United States
UFO sightings in the United States
1950s photographs
May 1950 events in the United States